Getting to Know You is a studio album by American jazz pianist Mulgrew Miller. The album was released in 1995 by Novus Records. This is Miller's third record for Novus and eleventh overall.

Background
The album is named after the popular song by Oscar Hammerstein II and Richard Rodgers, and consists of several standards and originals by Miller and Goods.

Reception
Ken Dryden of Allmusic wrote "Mulgrew Miller is in top form for these 1995 sessions as he covers a wide range of compositions. With his regular trio on hand, including bassist Richie Goods and drummer Karriem Riggins, plus the addition of percussionist Steve Kroon and conga player Big Black, this marked the pianist's final recording for the Novus label. Miller's exotic "Eastern Joy Dance" and thoughtful "Second Thoughts" (which brings James Williams' writing style to mind) provide an excellent introduction. Standards include a breezy waltz treatment of "Getting to Know You" (from The King and I) and a driving rendition of "If I Should Lose You." The Beatles' "Fool on the Hill" takes flight in Miller's hands, as he adds a sprightly touch without sounding like a cocktail pianist."

Track listing

Personnel
Band
Mulgrew Miller – piano
Big Black – congas (tracks: 1 2 4 7)
Karriem Riggins – drums
Richie Goods – bass
Steve Kroon – percussion (tracks: 1 2 7 8)

Production
Daniel Miller – photography
Sean Mosher-Smith – art direction
James Nichols – mastering, mixing
Steve Patterson – producer
Tim Patterson – producer
Samuel Fromartz – liner notes
Richard Clarke – mixing

References

1995 albums
Novus Records albums
Mulgrew Miller albums